Oscar Alfredo Cox (20 January 18806 October 1931) was a Brazilian sportsman who introduced football to the city of Rio de Janeiro and founded Fluminense, one of Brazil's most traditional and popular football clubs.

Biography
Born to a wealthy family of English Brazilian heritage, Oscar did his studies in Lausanne, where he got acquainted with the practice of football. Upon returning from Switzerland, Oscar tried to disseminate this activity in the city of Rio de Janeiro. On 22 September 1901, Oscar was able to organize the first football match in the history of the state of Rio de Janeiro. He then proceeded to São Paulo, with some friends, to play against a group led by Charles Miller, who had started the process of disseminating football in São Paulo back in 1894. The groups played two times against each other, and both matches ended in a draw.

On 21 July 1902, Oscar, aged 22, founded Fluminense. Fluminense remains as one of the most popular and traditional sports institutions still in existence in the history of Brazilian football.

After his death in France his remains were transferred to Rio de Janeiro.

References

See also
Henry Welfare

1880 births
1931 deaths
Sportspeople from Rio de Janeiro (city)
Brazilian people of English descent
Football people in Brazil
Brazilian football chairmen and investors
Brazilian expatriate sportspeople in France
Founders of association football institutions
Football in Rio de Janeiro (city)